Forbes Lake may refer to one of the following:

Forbes Lake (Saskatchewan)
Forbes Lake in the Forbes Creek Watershed of Washington State
Forbes Lake (Pictou County), Nova Scotia, Canada